Mohamed Coulibaly may refer to:

 Mohamed Coulibaly (footballer, born 1988), Senegalese footballer
 Mohamed Coulibaly (swimmer) (born 1989), Malian swimmer
 Mohamed Coulibaly (footballer, born 1994), Ivorian footballer